Austroturris steira is a species of sea snail, a marine gastropod mollusk in the family Borsoniidae.

Description
The length of the shell attains 8 mm, its breadth 3.5 mm.
(Original description) The small shell is solid and biconical. Its colour is uniform pale buff. The suture is channelled. It has seven whorls of which two constitute the protoconch.

Sculpture :—The dominant feature is a prominent peripheral keel revolving round all the whorls. The summit of each whorl is crowned by a double thread. Along the fasciole area run four slender threads. Between the keel and the anterior end of the shell occur about twenty cords, diminishing progressively as they recede from the periphery. Numerous crescentic threads cross the excavate fasciole. Fine radial lines also appear in the interstices of the basal spirals.

Aperture :—The sinus is wide and deep, the canal short and open, a thin film of callus on the upper lip.

Distribution
This marine species is endemic to Australia and occurs off New South Wales

References

 Hedley, C. 1922. A revision of the Australian Turridae. Records of the Australian Museum 13(6): 213–359, pls 42–56
 Laseron, C. 1954. Revision of the New South Wales Turridae (Mollusca). Australian Zoological Handbook. Sydney : Royal Zoological Society of New South Wales 1–56, pls 1–12. 
 Powell, A.W.B. 1967. The family Turridae in the Indo-Pacific. Part 1a. The Turrinae concluded. Indo-Pacific Mollusca 1(7): 409–443, pls 298–317 
 Wilson, B. 1994. Australian Marine Shells. Prosobranch Gastropods. Kallaroo, WA : Odyssey Publishing Vol. 2 370 pp.

steira
Gastropods described in 1922
Gastropods of Australia